Stainsby House is an architecturally notable house in Horsley Woodhouse, Derbyshire, England. It was designed by Nottingham architect David Shelley, and built for the businessman Robert Morley, owner of Alida Packaging at Heanor Gate. The house was completed in 1974.

Old Stainsby House
The original Stainsby House was demolished in 1972. Its remains are grade II listed with Historic England.

See also
Listed buildings in Horsley, Derbyshire, and Horsley Woodhouse

References

External links 

Wilmot-Sitwell family
Houses in Derbyshire
Grade II listed buildings in Derbyshire
Buildings and structures completed in 1974